Seán French (born 14 August 1999) is an Irish rugby union player for English RFU Championship club Bedford Blues. He plays as a centre, wing or fullback.

Early life
Born in Cork, French won the Munster Schools Rugby Senior Cup in 2017 with Presentation Brothers College, alongside former Munster teammates Jonathan Wren and Jack O'Sullivan, with French scoring all of PBC's points in their 11–3 victory. He was subsequently named in the top XV for the tournament that year. French also represented Munster at under-18 and under-19 level, as well as Ireland at under-18 and under-19 level.

Career

Cork Constitution
French was part of the Cork Con team that won the Munster Senior Cup during the 2018–19 season. He also scored a try in Con's 23–3 win against Dublin University on 28 April 2019, a victory that ensured Con progressed to the final of the 2018–19 All-Ireland League against Clontarf, and went on to start in the final, which Con won 28–13. French scored nine points in Con's 24–17 win against Young Munster in the final of the 2019–20 Munster Senior Cup on 20 December 2019.

Munster
French joined the Munster academy ahead of the 2018–19 season, and made his first appearance for Munster A in their 24–16 win against Connacht Eagles in round 1 of the 2018–19 Celtic Cup on 7 September 2018, before going on to feature in all Munster A's fixtures in the tournament. French made his senior competitive debut for Munster against Italian side Zebre in round 8 of the 2020–21 Pro14 on 30 November 2020, coming on in the 21st minute as a replacement for injured fullback Matt Gallagher and scoring a try in the province's 52–3 win. He joined the Munster senior squad on a one-year contract for the 2021–22 season, and made his first start for Munster in their 18–13 home win against provincial rivals Ulster in round 10 of the 2021–22 United Rugby Championship on 8 January 2022. French left Munster at the end of the 2021–22 season.

Bedford Blues
French joined English RFU Championship club Bedford Blues ahead of the 2022–23 season.

Ireland
French was selected in the Ireland under-20's squad for the 2019 Six Nations Under 20s Championship, featuring off the bench in the opening 35–27 win against England and starting in the wins against France and Wales, the latter of which secured Ireland's first grand slam since 2007. He was retained in the under-20s squad for the 2019 World Rugby Under 20 Championship, and featured off the bench in the opening fixture against England, preventing English lock Joel Kpoku from scoring a try and helping to setup John Hodnett's try to seal Ireland's 46–26 win. However, French sustained a facial injury during the game which ruled him out of the remainder of the tournament.

Honours

Presentation Brothers College
Munster Schools Rugby Senior Cup:
Winner (1): 2017

Cork Constitution
All-Ireland League Division 1A:
Winner (1): 2018–19
Munster Senior Cup:
Winner (2): 2018–19, 2019–20

Ireland under-20s
Six Nations Under 20s Championship:
Winner (1): 2019
Grand Slam:
Winner (1): 2019
 Triple Crown:
 Winner (1): 2019

References

External links
Munster Senior Profile
U20 Six Nations Profile
URC Profile

1999 births
Living people
People educated at Presentation Brothers College, Cork
Rugby union players from County Cork
Irish rugby union players
Cork Constitution players
Munster Rugby players
Bedford Blues players
Irish expatriate rugby union players
Expatriate rugby union players in England
Irish expatriate sportspeople in England
Rugby union centres
Rugby union wings
Rugby union fullbacks